The Dakatia River is a river of Bangladesh and India. It enters Bangladesh from Tripura. After re-entering India from Comilla District, it joins the Meghna River at Chandpur borostation molehead. It is in Chandpur.

Early history

The first tributary that the Meghna receives after entering Noakhali is the Dakatia river. "It is the combination of several hill streams via Sonaichari, Pagli Boaljar and Kakri, etc., originating from Tippera Hills. After traversing a distance of about 6 miles in the south it bifurcates at Latitude 230.21" and Longitude 910 31 '. The left hand branch follows a sinuous course in the south till it meets little Feni River, whereas the right hand branch flows in the south-west and north-west up to Hajiganj where Boa1juri river meets it on the right bank. Before taking an abrupt turn to the south at about 15 miles down Hajiganj the river throws off a channel, known as Chandpur Nullah which falls into the Meghna and the river following a meandering course drops into Meghna at Hazimara."

Dakatia was formerly a most important channel for trade. It is still navigable in the lower region by country boats during the monsoon season. The upper region is navigable throughout the year. There are three gauging stations on Dakatia river at Hajiganj, Raipur and Hazimara.

References

Rivers of Bangladesh
Rivers of Chittagong Division
Rivers of India
International rivers of Asia